Lafayette Frederick (9 March 1923 - 29 December 2018) was an American plant pathologist, mycologist, and specialist in myxomycete ecology and systematics.

Career
In 1943, Frederick earned his bachelor's degree at the Tuskegee Institute in Alabama. He pursued graduate work at the University of Hawaii before earning his master's degree in botany at the University of Rhode Island in 1950. He earned his PhD at Washington State University under .

Frederick joined the biology department at Southern University, before becoming chair of the Department of Biology at Atlanta University. He later joined the Department of Botany at Howard University in 1976, where he worked before retiring in 1993.

Frederick served as vice president of the Association of Southeastern Biologists from 1984 to 1985, and as president from 1985 to 1986.

Legacy
The Lafayette Frederick Underrepresented Minorities Scholarship is a scholarship given by the Association of Southeastern Biologists.

Harold St. John named the species Cyrtandra frederickii in his honor.

References

American mycologists
1923 births
2018 deaths
African-American biologists
African-American academics
20th-century African-American people
21st-century African-American people